Epidola melitensis is a moth of the family Gelechiidae. It was described by Hans Georg Amsel in 1955. It is found on Malta.

References

External links
 Epidola melitensis (Amsel, 1955) at Insecta.pro

Moths described in 1955
Epidola